Pantophthalmus is a genus of large, robust flies whose larvae feed on living and dead trees, and contains all but one of the species in the family Pantophthalmidae.

Species
Pantophthalmus argyropastus Bigot, 1880
Pantophthalmus batesi Austen, 1923
Pantophthalmus bellardii (Bellardi, 1862)
Pantophthalmus chuni (Enderlein, 1912)
Pantophthalmus comptus Enderlein, 1912
Pantophthalmus engeli (Enderlein, 1931)
Pantophthalmus facetus (Enderlein, 1931)
Pantophthalmus frauenfeldi (Schiner, 1868)
Pantophthalmus kerteszianus (Enderlein, 1914)
Pantophthalmus pictus (Wiedemann, 1821)
Pantophthalmus planiventris (Wiedemann, 1821)
Pantophthalmus punctiger (Enderlein, 1921)
Pantophthalmus roseni (Enderlein, 1931)
Pantophthalmus rothschildi (Austen, 1909)
Pantophthalmus splendidus Austen, 1923
Pantophthalmus subsignatus (Enderlein, 1931)
Pantophthalmus tabaninus Thunberg, 1819
Pantophthalmus vittatus (Wiedemann, 1828)
Pantophthalmus zoos (Enderlein, 1931)

References

Brachycera genera
Stratiomyoidea
Taxa named by Carl Peter Thunberg
Diptera of South America
Diptera of North America